Thomas Leroy Wilson (born December 19, 1970) is a former professional baseball player. He played all or parts of four seasons in Major League Baseball, primarily as a catcher.

Career
Drafted by the New York Yankees in the 23rd round of the 1990 Major League Baseball Draft, Wilson made his major league debut with the Oakland Athletics on May 19, 2001. He played nine games for the Athletics, and was traded in early 2002 to the Toronto Blue Jays for Mike Kremblas. He spent two seasons on the Blue Jays, playing 96 games each season. The following season, he played a few games with the Mets, and later the Dodgers, in his final major league season.

The highlight of Wilson's career came on October 5, 2004. As a member of the Los Angeles Dodgers, Wilson hit a solo home run in the National League Division Series against St. Louis Cardinals closer Jason Isringhausen. With this at bat being his only postseason plate appearance, Wilson boasts a 1.000 career postseason batting average with a 4.000 slugging percentage. This at bat was also the last official at bat of Wilson's major league career.

On December 21, 2004, Wilson became a free agent. He was signed to a minor league contract by the Colorado Rockies, but spent the entire season with their Triple-A affiliate, the Colorado Springs Sky Sox. A free agent again prior to the 2006 season, Wilson played for the Triple-A affiliate of the Florida Marlins, the Albuquerque Isotopes. Wilson compiled a career .253 batting average with 15 home runs and 76 runs batted in in 554 at-bats.

Following his retirement, Wilson became a scout for the New York Yankees.

References

External links

1970 births
Living people
Albuquerque Isotopes players
American expatriate baseball players in Canada
Baseball players from California
Colorado Springs Sky Sox players
Fullerton Hornets baseball players
Major League Baseball catchers
Oakland Athletics players
Toronto Blue Jays players
New York Mets players
Los Angeles Dodgers players
New York Yankees scouts
Oneonta Yankees players
Greensboro Hornets players
Albany-Colonie Yankees players
Tampa Yankees players
Norwich Navigators players
Columbus Clippers players
Buffalo Bisons (minor league) players
Tucson Sidewinders players
Durham Bulls players
Orlando Rays players
Sacramento River Cats players
Las Vegas 51s players
Norfolk Tides players